2016 Butig clash may refer to:
 February 2016 Butig clash
 November 2016 Butig clash